Bonn is an unincorporated community in Washington County, in the U.S. state of Ohio.

History
Bonn was laid out around 1835, and named after Bonn, in Germany, the native land of a large share of the first settlers. A post office called Bonn was established in 1844, and remained in operation until 1901.

References

Unincorporated communities in Washington County, Ohio
Unincorporated communities in Ohio